This is a list of countries by avocado production from 2016 to 2020, based on data from the Food and Agriculture Organization Corporate Statistical Database. The estimated total world production for avocados in 2020 was 8,059,359 metric tonnes, up 13.9% from 7,077,148 tonnes in 2019. Mexico was the largest producer, accounting for nearly 30% of global production. Dependent territories are shown in italics.

Production by country

Notes

References 

Avocado
Avocado
Avocado
Avocado